NGC 525, also occasionally referred to as PGC 5232 or UGC 972 is a lenticular galaxy located approximately 95.6 million light-years from the Solar System in the constellation Pisces. It was discovered on 25 September 1862 by astronomer Heinrich d'Arrest.

Observation history 
D'Arrest discovered NGC 525 using his 11-inch refractor telescope at Copenhagen. He located the galaxy's position with a total of two observations. As he also noted the mag 11-12 star just 2' northwest, his position is fairly accurate. The galaxy was later catalogued by John Louis Emil Dreyer in the New General Catalogue, where it was described as "very faint, very small, 11th or 12th magnitude star 5 seconds of time to west".

Description 
The galaxy appears very dim in the sky as it only has an apparent visual magnitude of 13.3 and thus can only be observed with telescopes. It can be classified as type S0 using the Hubble Sequence. The object's distance of roughly 95.6 million light-years from the Solar System can be estimated using its redshift and Hubble's law.

See also  
 List of NGC objects (1–1000)

References

External links 

 
 SEDS

Lenticular galaxies
Pisces (constellation)
0525
5232
Astronomical objects discovered in 1862
Discoveries by Heinrich Louis d'Arrest